Arenigobius bifrenatus, commonly known as the bridled goby, is a fish native to the waters of southern Australia.

Ecosystem 
The females lay demersal eggs in their burrows.

Arenigobius bifrenatus has invaded New Zealand; it was first recorded in 1998 and it has established populations in estuaries in the coasts of eastern Northland and Auckland. Passing ships dumping of ballast water is thought to be the means of invasion.

References

bifrenatus
Fish described in 1865